Chumatlan is a municipality in Veracruz, Mexico. It is located in the middle of the state, about 105 km from state capital Xalapa. It has a surface of 36.19 km2. The weather in Chumatlan is warm all year with rains in summer.

The municipality is delimited to the north by Coyutla, to the north-east by Espinal, to the south-west by Mecatlán and to the east by Coxquihui.

It produces principally maize, beans and coffee. A celebration in honor to Virgen de la Natividad, patron of the town, takes place in September.

References

External links
  Municipal Official webpage
  Municipal Official Information

Municipalities of Veracruz